Urva is a genus comprising the Asian mongooses within the mongoose family Herpestidae. Species in the genus were formerly classified in the genus Herpestes, which is now thought to comprise exclusively African mongooses; phylogenetic evidence indicates that the Asian mongooses form a monophyletic group and had an Asian common ancestor. Urva forms a clade with Xenogale and Atilax, while Herpestes forms a clade with all other African mongoose species.

An Urva fossil specimen, an upper molar tooth, was excavated in the Ayeyarwady River valley in central Myanmar and is estimated to date to the late Pliocene.

The scientific name Urva was coined by Brian Houghton Hodgson as the specific name of crab-eating mongoose in 1836, and as the generic name in the following year. Urva species have a wide distribution spanning from the Arabian Peninsula to the Indonesian island of Java.
The small Indian mongoose (U. auropunctata) has been introduced to several islands in the late 19th century, where it has become an invasive species.

Species 
Urva comprises the following species:

References

External links 
 

 
Mammal genera